Epimarptidae was a former, or is a possible, monotypic family of moths in the moth superfamily Gelechioidea. It can now be seen as either a synonym of family Batrachedridae, or a monotypic subfamily of that family.

Taxonomy and systematics
Epimarptidae was first created as a monotypic family by Edward Meyrick in 1914 to house his new genus Epimarptis, with a single species from India. Epimarptis remained monotypic until a second species was described from Sri Lanka by Meyrick three years later, although in this publication Meyrick decided to reclassify the genus in the family Epermeniidae, an interpretation he maintained in all his subsequent publications. Meyrick described his final  third species from Assam in far eastern India in 1931.

The genus remained encompassing three species from the Indian subcontinent until Kazuhiro Sugisima described a new species from Japan in 2004. Specimens of this moth had been collected numerous times since at least 1975, but had remained nameless up until then.

The concept of the superfamily Gelechioidea had begun to crystallise in the late 1960s, and in 1986 Joël Minet was the first to include the genus Epimarptis, unassigned to family, within this grouping. Minet resurrected the family Epimarptidae for the genus in 1990, and was followed in this by Sergey Yu. Sinev in 1992, but in 1998 Ron Hodges reclassified the family Epimarptidae as the subfamily Epimarptinae in the family Batrachedridae, based on a number of shared synapomorphies.

In the 2003 book Microlepidoptera of Europe Sjaak J. C. Koster and Sergey Yu. Sinev chose to disregard Hodges, continuing to view the subfamily Batrachedrinae at the rank of family (Batrachedridae), but it is unclear where they place Epimarptis (which doesn't occur in Europe).

In 2004 Lauri Kaila attempted to use cladistics to approximate the phylogeny of the superfamily Gelechioidea, using 193 morphological traits, and including Epimarptis. He lacked data for most of these morphological characters in Epimarptis, as the genus had not been seen again since Meyrick, let alone studied. Due to this incompleteness, he was obliged to exclude Epimarptis from much analysis, as depending on the most parsimonious consensus tree used, it might be classified as belonging to, or allied to, one of a number of different genera, which rendered a collapse of resolution in the basal clades of his Coleophoridae sensu lato. It was, however, clearly included in his Coleophoridae sensu lato, along with the family Coleophoridae sensu stricto, Hodges' subfamily Batrachedrinae and the genera Coelopoeta, Stathmopoda and perhaps Idioglossa. Kaila is careful to state that he was not formally revising Hodges' classification in his paper. When Sugisima published his new Epimarptis species a few months after Kaila's cladistic analysis, he attempted to fill in some of the missing morphological data in order to help resolve where the genus should be classified. However, the new data failed to give any more resolution, and in fact made the classification of Epimarptis within the Coleophoridae sensu lato possibly less certain, let alone whether it should be placed in the Batrachedridae or not. Sugisima mentions he finds the synapomorphies used by Hodges to define this latter family and its subfamilies in 1998 questionable in light of the further morphological observations made by him and Kaila.

In Zhi-Qiang Zhang's 2011 attempt to list all the known animal species of Earth, van Nieukerken et al., the authors of the section on Lepidoptera, were aware of Hodges' 1998 work but chose to repudiate it, and re-recognised Epimarptidae as a family again. Four species in the genus Epimarptis were still counted as belonging to the family at the time.

In 2014 work by Heikkilä et al. using cladistics essentially bolstered Hodges' 1998 viewpoint, synonymising this family with Batrachedridae.

Epimarptis Meyrick, 1914
Epimarptis philocoma Meyrick, 1914 - known from Mumbai, India
Epimarptis septicodes Meyrick, 1917 - Maskeliya, central Sri Lanka
Epimarptis isoloxa Meyrick, 1931 - Assam, India
Epimarptis hiranoi Sugisima, 2004 - Honshu, Japan

The new species Houdinia flexissima from New Zealand appears to be very similar and may be closely related to this group, along with two undescribed species from New Zealand and Australia. Hoare et al. classified the species in the family Batrachedridae, as opposed to the Epimarptidae, due to Kaila's 2004 statement regarding formally revising the classification, but it might properly be placed in the Epimarptidae, or at least the subfamily Epimarptinae sensu Hodges, depending on the taxonomy used.

According to Sugisima it is very probable that many more new species within the genus have already been collected and many specimens await description whilst gathering dust in musea and collections in Japan and Europe.

Ecology
Almost absolutely nothing is known about the ecology of the family. Epimarptis hiranoi was mostly collected at low altitudes, E. philocoma presumably as well, but E. septicodes was collected at relatively high elevations. The moths all appear to be night-fliers. In E. hiranoi, imagoes are only known to fly from mid-June to mid-July, with a peak in the second quarter. The larvae of none of the species have ever been seen (or recognised as such), and the life histories or host plants of none of the species are known.

References

 
Gelechioidea
Moth families